Hajnalka Tóth (born 27 August 1976) is a Hungarian fencer, team World champion in 1999 and 2002, team European champion in 2001. She competed in the women's team épée event at the 2004 Summer Olympics.

References

External links
 
 Profile at the European Fencing Confederation

1976 births
Living people
Hungarian female épée fencers
Olympic fencers of Hungary
Fencers at the 2004 Summer Olympics
People from Békéscsaba
Sportspeople from Békés County
21st-century Hungarian women